Kohei Tanaka may refer to:
 Kohei Tanaka (composer), Japanese composer
 Kohei Tanaka (footballer), Japanese footballer